Edwin Silverman (1898 – February 12, 1970) was an American businessman who co-founded the Essaness Theatres chain and founded WSNS-TV.

Biography
Silverman was born to a Jewish family in Chicago.  He worked as a poster clerk at the First National Pictures Corp. where he eventually became general sales manager of Warner Bros. after it took control of First National Pictures. 

In 1929, he co-founded the Essaness Theatres Corporation in Chicago with Sidney M. Spiegel Jr., grandson of Joseph Spiegel, founder of the Spiegel catalog. The name is a play on the founder's last names Silverman & Spiegel with S&S becoming ESS-AN-ESS. The company eventually owned 33 theaters in the Chicago area. He was also the founder of WSNS-TV channel 44 in Chicago (SNS mirrors the pronunciation of "Essaness"). He retired to Palm Springs where he was a supporter of the Desert Hospital. 

By 1984, the chain operated 86 movie screens in Illinois, Indiana and Wisconsin.

Personal life
He had one daughter, Susan, and two sons, Jack and Alan, both executives of Essaness. He was buried at the Rosehill Cemetery in Chicago.

References

External links
Chicagology: "Essaness Theatres" retrieved December 19, 2017

1898 births
1970 deaths
American theatre managers and producers
American Jews
People from Chicago
Film exhibitors
Warner Bros. people